Charles Alfred Taylor (1922–2002) was a British physicist well known for his work in crystallography and his efforts to promote science to young audiences.

Early life
Charles Taylor was born in Hull in 1922.

Education
He began his degree at Queen Mary College (a constituent college of the University of London), but the college was subsequently evacuated to Cambridge during World War II. He graduated in 1943 and  after working for the Admiralty during the war, then worked as a lecturer and then a reader after completing his PhD.

Career
His first work was for the Admiralty designing radar countermeasures, work that eventually took him to Harvard University in the United States until the end of the war. He then studied for a PhD at the University of Manchester Institute of Science and Technology, and was there from 1948 until 1965.  He worked for a long time with Henry Lipson on the development of optical diffraction analogue methods. He was awarded a DSc in 1960.

In 1965 he moved with his family to Cardiff to take up the position of Chair of Physics at University College Cardiff, where the main interest of the department was X-ray crystallography, in the same field as the work he did with Lipson in Manchester.

He was appointed to the post of Visiting Professor of Experimental Physics at the Royal Institution, a post he held until 1988. He also gave many other lectures to schoolchildren. In 1990 he lectured to thousands of children in Tokyo as a follow up to his Christmas Lectures in London the previous year.

Publications
Taylor was the author of a number of books, including 'The Art and Science of Lecture Demonstration'.  Most notably, with Stephen Pople, he wrote the worldwide selling 'Oxford Children's Book of Science' (1994).

Lectures
As well as his work in research, Taylor also had very close links to the Royal Institution.  He had always had a strong interest in music and its relationship with physics.  In 1971 he lectured to schoolchildren for the Royal Institution Christmas Lectures on Exploring Music covering physics and music.  In 1989 he became only the third person since 1945 to deliver a second series of Christmas lectures, with the title 'Exploring Music'.

Honours
Taylor was awarded the Lawrence Bragg Medal by the Institute of Physics in 1983 for his outstanding and sustained contributions to physics education. In 1986 he was unanimously awarded the first ever Michael Faraday Award by the Royal Society for communicating science to public audiences.  Altogether he gave over 150 lectures to schoolchildren at the Royal Institution, as well as presenting 8 Friday evening discourses there.

Family life
Taylor married in 1944 and had 3 children, 8 grandchildren and 2 great-grandchildren at the time of his death, in 2002 at the age of 79.

References

1922 births
2002 deaths
British physicists
Academics of Cardiff University
Alumni of Queen Mary University of London
Harvard University staff
Alumni of the University of Manchester Institute of Science and Technology
Academics of the University of Manchester Institute of Science and Technology
Scientists from Kingston upon Hull
Royal Navy personnel of World War II
Admiralty personnel of World War II